Sainte-Julie is the name of several places:

 Sainte-Julie, Quebec
 Sainte-Julie, Ain, a commune of the Ain département, in France